Weiss Lake in northeastern Alabama is owned and operated by the Alabama Power Company. Weiss Lake also has privately owned hotels, marinas, campground and bait and tackle stores. There are 11 bridges that cross Weiss Lake.

Weiss Dam, creating the reservoir, was begun as the first of seven hydroelectric projects on the Coosa in 1958, and finished three years later. A book by local newspaper editor Douglas Scott Wright, titled A History of Weiss Lake, describes the decades-long battle to build a series of dams along the upper Coosa River, the farmers who tried to stop construction of Weiss Dam, the lake's namesake, and the ups and downs that the community have experienced since it was completed in June 1961.

Weiss Lake contains crappie, largemouth bass, and striped bass. In 2009, the population of bass consists of 15–18 inch preferred size bass as well as abundant numbers of young growing bass. The striped bass population primarily consist of 3–7 pound fish, but fish over 25 pounds have been caught as well. The best seasons for fishing crappie are March through May, yet September through November months are good as well. The best bass months are February through May, and in October and November. The Rome Sailing Club began at Garden Lakes in 1955, but moved to Weiss Lake in 1980.

References

Protected areas of Cherokee County, Alabama
Protected areas of Floyd County, Georgia
Reservoirs in Alabama
Reservoirs in Georgia (U.S. state)
Dams in Alabama
Hydroelectric power plants in Alabama
Alabama Power dams
Dams completed in 1961
Bodies of water of Cherokee County, Alabama
Bodies of water of Floyd County, Georgia